jan muhammad S/O bachal khaskheli goth abdullah khaskheli  was a classical singer from Sindh, Pakistan.

He was born on 25 January 1966 at Mirpur Bathoro. He received music training from his father. He has many albums of Sindhi songs to his credit. He sang poetry of Shah Abdul Latif Bhitai, Sachal Sarmast and others. He died in a road accident near Tando Allahyar on 24 June 2016.

See also
Allan Fakir

References

1966 births
2016 deaths
Pakistani classical singers
Sindhi-language singers
Sindhi people